Zoraida is a 1779 tragedy by the British writer William Hodson with fictional characters based on the real story of conquest of Egypt by Ottoman ruler Selim the first. The original Drury Lane cast included William 'Gentleman' Smith as Almaimon, Robert Bensley as Osman, James Aickin as Zirvad, John Phillimore as Heli, John Hayman Packer as Moralmin, John Palmer as Selim and Mary Ann Yates as Zoraida.

Plot

Act 1
In scene 1,Zoraida, a female orphan at the court of Egypt talks to her friend Zulima(who is the daughter of Moralmin, the Governor of Cairo for Almaimon and who grew up with Zoraida since her infancy days) about her worries regarding her parent's past against the terror of the rule of Ottoman Emperor Selim the first,concealed by his adopted parents and fears Almaimon will die, but Zulima comforts her by reminding of Almorad's affection to Zoraida as an adopted parent during her happy days.In scene 2,Moralmin taks to Zoraida,eager to share his rosy expectations for Almaimon reclaiming Egypt from Selim the first of the Ottoman empire.Zulima suggests to Zoraida to join the fight, however Zoraida says as her female sex limits from participating in battle, she suggests to Zulima to pray to Allah to wish the people fighting in battle good luck. In Scene 3,Almaimon faces a tough fight and senses defeat of his army and worries about Zoraida being in bad hands.In scene 4, Moralmin now prisoner of Selim I, is questioned by Selim, and Moralmin confesses his loyalty to Almaimon despite being captured and rather curses the glory of Selim be destroyed in ruins. In scene 5,Osman seemingly show his loyal side to Selim, secretly seeks vengeance to the Sultan Selim the first.In Scene 6,at the castle,despite Zulima's persuasions, Zoraida has a pessimistic view of the battle and tries to give up but change her mind after not wishing to be caught as captive of the enemy.In scene 7, the situation escalates as the betrayal of Almaimon's troops had excacerbated the battle on the Almaimon's side.In scene 8,Motafar notifies the crew of the princess's escape and his support of their escape.

Act 2
Zoraida comes before the Sultan Selim as captive, who takes her to his harem.Selim,tries to take her heart,which is what Osman intends to happen to distract Sultan from being wsry of his plans.Meanwhile, Almaimon is saddened by Zoraida being captive.Almaimon receives a scroll about Osman, which would help with his mission of liberating Egypt and freeing zoraida.Almaimon meets Osman, who tells his risky plans in detail, which is an attack when the guards are asleep.

Act3

Act4
Zoraida hears from Zulima that Almaimon is murdered, which he is not.Zulima also worries her sire Moralmin is also dead.Meanwhile,Selim feels betrayed against Osman for the rescue mission, saying he would be noble. However Selim decides to trust Osman one more time to persuade Almaimon.

Act5
Selim returns Zoraida to Almaimon saying heaven forbids their union.Almaimon thanks God.

References

Bibliography
 Nicoll, Allardyce. A History of English Drama 1660-1900: Volume III. Cambridge University Press, 2009.
 Hogan, C.B (ed.) The London Stage, 1660-1800: Volume V''. Southern Illinois University Press, 1968.

External links
 Full original text of Zoraida. 
1779 plays
British plays
Tragedy plays
West End plays